Hammersmith Bridge is a suspension bridge that crosses the River Thames in west London. It links the southern part of Hammersmith in the London Borough of Hammersmith and Fulham, on the north side of the river, and Barnes in the London Borough of Richmond upon Thames, on the south side of the river. The current bridge, which is Grade II* listed and was designed by civil engineer Sir Joseph Bazalgette, is the second permanent bridge on the site, and has been attacked three times by Irish republicans.

The bridge was closed indefinitely to all motor traffic in April 2019 after cracks were discovered in the bridge's pedestals. The closure was extended to pedestrians and cyclists between August 2020 and July 2021 when limited use resumed. In October 2022, Hammersmith and Fulham Council agreed to lodge a planning application to temporarily double-deck the bridge to speed up its restoration, with the council's construction and ongoing operation and maintenance costs set to be eventually funded by tolls.

History

Origins
A group of local people proposed a new bridge at Hammersmith rather than detouring to either Kew Bridge or Putney Bridge to cross the river. The construction of the bridge was first sanctioned by an Act of Parliament on 9 June 1824, which established the Hammersmith Bridge Company. Work began on site the following year, and the bridge was opened on 6 October 1827. Construction of the bridge cost some £80,000 (equivalent to £ million in ).

It was the first suspension bridge over the River Thames and was designed by William Tierney Clark. A further Act of Parliament was obtained in 1828. The acts also included powers to acquire land by compulsory purchase in order to build approach roads, and required the company to purchase the entire Barn Elms estate (the surplus land was subsequently sold).

Hammersmith Bridge Road in Hammersmith was also constructed with the bridge, together with Upper Bridge Road (now Castelnau) and Lower Bridge Road (now Lonsdale Road) in Barnes. It was operated as a toll bridge, with the toll house located at the Hammersmith end of the bridge.

There were eight chains, composed of wrought-iron bars, each five inches deep and one thick. From these, vertical rods were suspended, which supported the roadway, formed of strong timbers covered with granite. The chains passed over the suspension towers, and were secured to the piers on each shore. The suspension towers were built of stone, and designed as archways of the Tuscan order. The approaches were provided with octagonal lodges, or toll-houses, with appropriate lamps and parapet walls, terminating with stone pillars, surmounted with ornamental caps.

In order to increase profits, the company built a floating steamboat pier to the downstream side of the suspension pier closest to Barnes.

By the 1870s, the bridge was no longer strong enough to support the weight of heavy traffic and the owners were alarmed in 1870 when 11,000 to 12,000 people crowded onto the bridge to watch the University Boat Race, which passes underneath just before the halfway point of its  course.

The Metropolitan Board of Works purchased the bridge from the Hammersmith Bridge Company in 1880 under the Metropolis Toll Bridges Act 1877, and transferred the approach roads to the local authorities (Fulham District Board of Works and the Parish of Barnes). The tolls were removed from the bridge on 26 June 1880.

There were no immediate plans to replace the bridge, which remained sound, until a boat collided with it in 1882 causing damage, and leading to an Act of Parliament in 1883 authorising the construction of a replacement. In 1884 a temporary bridge was put up to allow a more limited cross-river traffic while a replacement was constructed.

1880s construction
The current Hammersmith Bridge was designed by Sir Joseph Bazalgette and rests on the same pier foundations constructed for Tierney Clark's original structure. The new bridge was built by Dixon, Appleby & Thorne and was opened by the Prince of Wales on 11 June 1887.

With the abolition of the Metropolitan Board of Works on 21 March 1889, ownership of Hammersmith Bridge passed to the new London County Council.

20th century
Near midnight on 27 December 1919, Lieutenant Charles Campbell Wood, a South African serving as an airman in the Royal Air Force, dived from the upstream footway of the bridge into the Thames to rescue a drowning woman. Although Wood saved her life, he later died from tetanus as a consequence of his injuries. His act of bravery is commemorated by a plaque on the handrail, which reads: 

The first attempt by Irish republicans to destroy Hammersmith Bridge occurred on Wednesday 29 March 1939, when it was attacked by the IRA (of 1922–1969) as part of their S-Plan. Maurice Childs, a women's hairdresser from nearby Chiswick, was walking home across the bridge at one o'clock in the morning when he noticed smoke and sparks coming from a suitcase that was lying on the walkway. He opened it to find a bomb and quickly threw the bag into the river. The resulting explosion sent up a  column of water. Moments later, a second device exploded causing some girders on the west side of the bridge to collapse and windows in nearby houses to shatter. Childs was later awarded an MBE for his quick-thinking. Eddie Connell and William Browne were subsequently jailed for 20 and 10 years respectively for their involvement in the attack.

On 1 April 1965, the bridge was transferred to the Greater London Council (GLC) when it took over from London County Council.

In 1986 the GLC was abolished. The Local Government Act 1985 transferred non-trunk road bridges in their entirety to one of the two London boroughs that each bridge lay within – the choice of borough to be decided between the two councils, or failing agreement, by the Secretary of State for Transport. In addition to the bridge, the London borough taking responsibility also gained 100 yards of approach road from the other borough. For Hammersmith Bridge, on 31 March 1986 the London Borough of Hammersmith and Fulham took responsibility.

On 26 April 1996, the Provisional IRA attempted to destroy the bridge after installing two large Semtex devices on the south bank of the Thames. Though the detonators were activated, the bomb, the largest Semtex bomb ever found in Britain at the time, failed to ignite.

At 4:30 am on 1 June 2000, the bridge was damaged by a Real IRA bomb planted underneath the Barnes span. Following two years of closure for repairs the bridge was reopened with further weight restrictions in place.

Structural problems

Hammersmith Bridge has long suffered structural problems and has been closed for lengthy periods on several occasions, due to the weight and volume of road traffic now common in inner London, which the bridge was not originally designed to support.

The bridge was refurbished in 1973 with replacement steel trusses, improvements to the mid-span hangers and new deck expansion joints. New deck timbers were installed and surfacing was changed from wooden blocks to coated plywood panels. These panels were subsequently replaced in 1987.

In 1984, the Barnes-side tower bearings failed under a heavy load and had to be replaced.

In February 1997, the bridge was closed to all traffic except buses, bicycles, motorcycles, emergency vehicles and pedestrians to allow further essential repair works. Structural elements of the bridge had been found to be corroded or worn, in particular cross girders and deck surfacing, as well as some areas of masonry.

The bridge re-opened in July 1998 to all road users, subject to a  weight restriction and with a priority measure in place for buses. Local bus flow was controlled by traffic lights, and routes (such as the number 72) were required to convert from double-decker buses to smaller single-deckers to reduce the load on the bridge.

As part of the renovations following the 2000 bomb attack, the bridge received a complete new paint job restoring it to the original colour scheme of 1887, and new lighting was installed.

The bridge was declared a Grade II* listed structure in 2008, providing protection to preserve its special character from unsympathetic development.

The bridge was temporarily closed to traffic to allow repairs in early 2014. Further repairs and strengthening works were delayed in November 2016 in a wrangle over funding between Hammersmith and Fulham Council and Transport for London. LBHF leader Steven Cowan said: "There's no way that this council is going to spend anything like that money, the majority of this issue is the responsibility of TfL and we will work with them to make sure the bridge is fit for public purpose".

2019–22 closure
With funding for a major refurbishment still not resolved, on 10 April 2019, Hammersmith and Fulham Council announced that the bridge would be closed indefinitely to motor vehicular traffic due to safety concerns. Pedestrians and cyclists could continue to use the bridge. It was later (24 May 2019) reported that the closure was due to cracks in the bridge's pedestals, the footings which support the structure.

On 10 October 2019, Planning in London magazine published the results of its competition for a quick fix to Hammersmith Bridge's closure. The winning entry, by marine civil engineers Beckett Rankine, consisted of a prefabricated temporary road and foot bridge downstream of Hammersmith bridge and connecting in to Queen Caroline Street on the Hammersmith side. Beckett Rankine claimed that the bridge's cost could be recouped by charging a toll on vehicles.

The bridge's closure was extended to pedestrians and cyclists on 13 August 2020 after the structural issues worsened due to a heatwave. River traffic and pedestrian routes under the bridge were also stopped. The New York Times reported an estimate of £141 million (US$187 million) to fully repair the bridge and £46 million (US$65 million) to stabilise it adequately for use by cyclists and pedestrians. Neither the council nor the transportation authority had the funds to proceed. Deficits incurred due to the COVID-19 pandemic made it unlikely that the bridge would be repaired in the near future.

On 9 September 2020, the Secretary of State for Transport, Grant Shapps appointed a Department for Transport task force to investigate the bridge's condition, and work towards reopening the bridge for cyclists and pedestrians, and later enabling the return of motor traffic. In October 2020, it was announced that Hammersmith Bridge would not re-open to vehicles until at least 2027. In November 2020, engineers proposed a temporary double-decked steel structure fitted within the existing bridge crossing to allow elements of the damaged bridge to be removed for repair. The scheme, designed by Foster and Partners with bridge engineers COWI, was backed by the local council and presented to Shapps.

The Fosters scheme, costed at around £100m, would potentially allow the bridge to reopen for pedestrians and cyclists in the summer of 2021, with cars and vans able to cross two months later, and full restoration completed in 2023. The proposals were discussed on 19 March 2021 at a meeting of the government's Hammersmith Bridge taskforce, and plans for the work to be funded through a £3 toll scheme were accepted.

In December 2020, reports from AECOM and University of Cambridge professor Norman Fleck suggested that the full closure may have been overly cautious, and that, after minimal work, the bridge could be reopened to cyclists and pedestrians.

On 14 February 2021, local residents illuminated the bridge scarlet with a Valentine's Day message reading Broken Hearts. Broken Promises. Broken Lives. Broken Bridge, to highlight the ongoing delays to its repair.

2021: partial reopening

On 1 June 2021, Transport for London, Hammersmith and Fulham Borough Council and central government came to a cost-sharing agreement that would reopen the bridge in the near future. The following month, Stephen Cowan, leader of the Council, announced that the bridge would partially re-open to pedestrians and cyclists from 17 July 2021, but local MP Sarah Olney said there was still a lot of work to be done to the bridge.

A £6m, 46-week stabilisation plan designed by consultants Mott MacDonald was approved by Hammersmith and Fulham Council in August 2021. This initial pedestrian stabilisation plan is the first phase of works on the bridge. A second phase, involving extensive strengthening and full restoration, will allow the bridge to eventually reopen to motor vehicles.

2022: repairs

In February 2022, highways contractor FM Conway and subcontractors Freyssinet and Taziker Industrial started work on a planned 10-month first phase of the restoration. The council approved the full £8.9m investment in expectation that DfT and TfL will subsequently reimburse the council for their one-third shares. Completion of this work was put back to February 2023 following delays in procuring steel due to the war in Ukraine.

In May 2022, Hammersmith and Fulham Council alerted contractors to the £130M phase 2 contract ahead of formal procurement later in the year. It was considering delivery options including a design, build, finance and maintain model, a design-and-build contract, or other "concession-style models", which could involve motor vehicles paying a toll to use the crossing. A council spokesman said: "The government has decreed that Hammersmith and Fulham must pay an unprecedentedly high 33% of the total cost. The only way that can be met is with a toll and this has been agreed by all parties."

In July 2022, the chains were wrapped in foil and cooled with air-conditioning to 13°C during a heatwave to prevent further cracking.

In October 2022, Hammersmith and Fulham Council agreed to lodge a planning application to temporarily double-deck the bridge to speed up its restoration (as recommended by Foster/COWI). Consultation would be required with stakeholders including Historic England, the Environment Agency, Port of London Authority, Richmond Council and the Marine Management Organisation, while preparations would also require gas main diversions. The council intended to appoint a private sector contractor to design, renovate, finance and maintain the bridge, with the council's construction and ongoing operation and maintenance costs funded by tolls.

Heraldry

At both the Hammersmith and Barnes ends of the bridge, there is a heraldic composition made up of seven coats of arms. These were formerly painted in their "correct" heraldic colours but have now been painted in the standard colour scheme. In the centre is the royal coat of arms of Queen Victoria which is surrounded by six others, representing the area of the Metropolitan Board of Works, from top clockwise: 
1: Coat of arms of the Borough of Guildford (representing Surrey): Sable, on a mount vert between two woolpacks argent a castle with three towers argent the central one triple-towered and charged with a shield of the royal arms of France and England quarterly the outer towers each surmounted by a spire under the battlements two roses in fesse and within the open port beneath a portcullis a key all Or on the mount before the port a lion chouchant guardant also or the base barry wavy argent and azure
2: Coat of arms of the City of Westminster: Azure, a portcullis or on a chief of the second a pallet of the first thereon a cross flory between five martlets also of the second being the arms of King Edward the Confessor between two united roses gules and argent
3: Coat of arms of the Borough of Colchester (representing Essex): Gules, four pieces of wood raguly conjoined in a cross proper each side arm transfixed with a nail palewise sable ensigned by an ancient crown or and that in base enfiling a like crown and transfixed by a like nail in bend
4: Coat of arms of the County of Middlesex (in its original form without the crown, identical to that of the later Essex County Council)
5: Coat of arms of the City of London
6: Coat of arms of the County of Kent

See also
 Crossings of the River Thames
 Sir John Scott Lillie – shareholder in the 1820s Hammersmith Bridge project
 List of bridges in London

References
Citations

Sources

External links

  Partial view of William Tierney Clark's bridge, circa 1880
 
 
 London Landscape TV episode (6 mins) about Hammersmith Bridge
 Information and updates about the 2019 closure of Hammersmith Bridge, and proposals to keep it car-free
 Proposal for floating-pontoon ferry

1887 establishments in England
Barnes, London
Bridges across the River Thames
Bridges in London
Bridges completed in 1887
Buildings and structures in the London Borough of Hammersmith and Fulham
Former toll bridges in England
Grade II* listed bridges in London
Grade II* listed buildings in the London Borough of Hammersmith and Fulham
Grade II* listed buildings in the London Borough of Richmond upon Thames
Hammersmith
History of the London Borough of Hammersmith and Fulham
Terrorist incidents in London
Terrorist incidents in the United Kingdom in 2000
Tourist attractions in the London Borough of Richmond upon Thames
Transport in the London Borough of Hammersmith and Fulham
Transport in the London Borough of Richmond upon Thames